Eugenio Toussaint Uhtohff (October 9, 1954 – February 8, 2011) was a Mexican composer, arranger and jazz musician.

Eugenio died from an antidepressant's overdose on February 8, 2011 in Mexico City.

References

External links 
 http://www.eugeniotoussaint.com/
 https://web.archive.org/web/20091006052706/http://www.ejazznews.com/modules.php?op=modload&name=News&file=article&sid=8762&mode=thread&order=0&thold=0
 http://www.terra.com.mx/ArteyCultura/articulo/1040059/Murio+Eugenio+Toussaint+pianista+y+compositor+mexicano+de+jazz.htm

1954 births
2011 deaths
Mexican composers
Mexican male composers
Mexican jazz musicians
Mexican music arrangers
Mexican people of French descent
Male jazz musicians